Kottimukula Alagaraja Singaparaja Raja, known as K.A.S. Raja, was an Indian military officer.

Early life 
K.A.S. Raja was born to a politically prominent family from Madras, India. He was a nephew of P. S. Kumaraswamy Raja, who served as the Chief Minister of Madras Presidency and Governor of Orissa.

Military career 
On the 17th June 1940 Raja enlisted in the ranks of the 11th (Madras) battalion, Indian Territorial Force then on the 28th July 1940 was granted a viceroy's commission in the rank of Jemadar in the same unit. The battalion was converted to a regular battalion of the British Indian Army on 15th September, 1941 titled the 1st Battalion, 3rd Madras Regiment. On the 21st December 1941 Raja received an emergency commission as a second lieutenant in the 3rd Madras Regiment in the British Indian Army.

Raja fought in the Burma campaign and qualified as a paratrooper, choosing to wear a parachutist badge throughout the rest of his career. Following the end of the war, he studied at a military staff college in India. In 1946 he was granted a regular Indian Army commission.  Following India's independence in 1947, he was made commander of a battalion in the Indian Army. He commanded the 1st Battalion of the Madras Regiment with the rank of lieutenant colonel during the Indo-Pakistani War of 1947–1948.

In the spring of 1961 Raja led a 4,500 strong contingent, the Indian Independent Brigade Group, to the Republic of the Congo to serve as a peacekeeping force in the United Nations Operation in the Congo (ONUC). On 5 August 1961 ONUC created an independent Katanga Command under Raja headquartered in Élisabethville. On 28 August he led ONUC forces in conducting Operation Rum Punch, and action to detain and deport mercenaries and foreign military personnel serving in the Katangese Gendarmerie. He returned to India with his brigade in April 1962.

Legacy 
In the 2016 film The Siege of Jadotville, based on the events of the Siege of Jadotville and concurrent Operation Morthor in September 1961, Raja's role is portrayed by the character General Raja.

References

Works cited 
 
 

People from Tamil Nadu
British Indian Army officers
Paratroopers
Possibly living people
Year of birth missing
Indian generals
Indian Army personnel of World War II
People of the Congo Crisis